Želite li da postanete milioner? (Do you want to become a millionaire?) is a Serbian game show based on the original British format of Who Wants to Be a Millionaire?. The show is hosted by Ivan Zeljković.

The main goal of the game is to win 5 million Serbian dinars (earlier – 3 million dinars) by answering 15 multiple-choice questions correctly. There are four lifelines – fifty fifty (pola-pola), phone a friend (pozovi prijatelja), ask the audience (pitajte publiku) and switch the question (zamena pitanja, since 2007, this lifeline is unlocked when player wins 5,000 dinars). From 2010 to 2011 when show move to Prva Srpska Televizija fourth lifeline switch the question (zamena pitanja) was replace to ask one of the audience (glas naroda, there contestant ask 3 people from audience for answer; this lifeline is unlocked when player wins 5,000 dinars).

Želite li da postanete milioner? is broadcast from 2002 to 2011. From 2002 to 2006 it was shown on RTV BK Telecom, from 2007 to 2009 on B92, and from 2010 to 2011 on Prva Srpska Televizija. From 2002 to 2006 the biggest prize was 3 million dinars, but from 2007 to 2011 it is 5 million. When a contestant gets the fifth question correct, he leaves with at least 5,000 dinars (earlier 3,000). When a contestant gets the tenth question correct, he leaves with at least 150,000 dinars (earlier 96,000).

The biggest prize ever won on this show is 2,500,000 dinars by Agošton Legvari from Bačko Gradište and Saša Tomić from Požarevac.

The game's prizes

References

External links
Official site

Who Wants to Be a Millionaire?
Serbian game shows
2002 Serbian television series debuts
2011 Serbian television series endings
RTV BK Telecom original programming
Non-British television series based on British television series
id:Super Milyarder 3 Milyar
sr:Желите ли да постанете милионер?